The Adventures of Gulliver is a 1968 television cartoon produced by Hanna-Barbera Productions. The show is loosely based on the 1726 satirical novel Gulliver's Travels by Jonathan Swift.  The show aired Saturday mornings on ABC-TV and lasted for one season in its original broadcast.

Plot
While on a treasure-hunting voyage with his father, Gary Gulliver and his dog Tagg end up shipwrecked on an island. On this island is the kingdom of Lilliput, where its inhabitants have a height of only a few centimeters. Gary and Tagg are caught by the Lilliputians while they are recovering from the shipwreck, but afterwards they become great friends. With the help of the Lilliputians, Gary continues searching for his missing father. (A subplot in the series involves a map that Gary's father left to him after secretly putting it inside Tagg's collar before the shipwreck). The villain of the series is the evil Captain Leech who, in the adventures, is always attempting to steal the map from Gary.

Broadcast history
Seventeen episodes were produced and were originally broadcast on ABC in the fall and winter of 1968-69. The episodes were rerun through the summer of 1970. In 1971, the show became part of The Banana Splits and Friends Show, the syndicated version of The Banana Splits Adventure Hour. Toys were produced in Germany by Heimo.

Voice cast
 Jerry Dexter – Gary Gulliver
 John Stephenson – Captain John Leech, Thomas Gulliver (Gary's father), and King Pomp (monarch of Lilliput)
 Ginny Tyler – Flirtacia (King Pomp's daughter and princess of Lilliput)
 Allan Melvin – Bunko (a Lilliputian)
 Don Messick – Eager (a Lilliputian) and Tagg (Gary's dog)
 Herb Vigran – Glum (a Lilliputian)

List of episodes

Additional series credits
 Associate Producer: Lew Marshall
 Story Direction: Howard Swift
 Story by: Ken Spears, Joe Ruby
 Animation Director: Charles A. Nichols
 Production Design: Iwao Takamoto
 Production Coordinator: Victor O. Schipek
 Layouts: John Ahern, Pete Alvarado, Dick Bickenbach, Brad Case, Walt Clinton, Richard Gonzalez, Gary Hoffman, Jack Huber, Tom Knowles, Lance Nolley, Joel Seibel, Don Sheppard
 Animation: Ray Abrams, Carlos Alfonso, Bob Bemiller, Ron Campbell, Shannon Lee Dyer, Hugh Fraser, George Goepper, Fernando Gonzales, Sam Jaimes, Volus Jones, Dick Lundy, Ed Parks, Don Patterson, Ray Patterson, Irv Spence, Bob Taylor, Lloyd Vaughan, Allen Wilzbach
 Backgrounds: Walt Peregoy, Janet Brown, Sheila Brown, Albert Gmuer, Fernando Montealegre, Gary Niblett, Eric Semones, Peter Van Elk
 Titles: Robert Schaefer
 Music Director: Ted Nichols
 Technical Supervisor: Frank Paiker
 Ink and Paint Supervisor: Roberta Greutert
 Xerography: Robert "Tiger" West
 Sound Direction: Richard Olson
 Film Editing: Geoffrey Griffin, James Yaras
 Camera: George Epperson, Charles Flekal, Bill Kotler, Ralph Migliori, Cliff Shirpser, Roy Wade
A Hanna-Barbera Production. Hanna-Barbera Productions, Inc. ©MCMLXVIII-MCMLXXI All rights reserved.

See also
 List of works produced by Hanna-Barbera Productions
 List of Hanna-Barbera characters

References

External links
 
 

1960s American animated television series
1970s American animated television series
1968 American television series debuts
1970 American television series endings
American children's animated action television series
American children's animated adventure television series
American children's animated fantasy television series
American Broadcasting Company original programming
Gulliver's Travels
Television series by Hanna-Barbera
Television series by Warner Bros. Television Studios
Hanna-Barbera superheroes